Petra Weschenfelder (born 22 April 1964) is a German former footballer who played as a defender, appearing for the East Germany women's national team in their first and only match on 9 May 1990.

Career statistics

International

References

External links
 

1964 births
Living people
German women's footballers
East German women's footballers
East Germany women's international footballers
Women's association football defenders
FF USV Jena players